Philip I, known as Philip of Savoy (1278 – 25 September 1334) was the lord of Piedmont from 1282 until his death and prince of Achaea between 1301 and 1307. He was the son of Thomas III of Piedmont and Guyonne de Châlon.

Philip's first marriage was celebrated in Rome on 12 February 1301 to Isabella of Villehardouin, Princess of Achaea. By that marriage, he became Prince of Achaea, though he had already been lord of Piedmont by inheritance from his father in 1282. He was, however, an authoritative prince and this put him at odds with the baronage of his realm. He tried to placate the barons of Morea, but was forced to accept a parliament in 1304. The Greek archonts from Skorta revolted in 1302. In 1307, King Charles II of Naples, the suzerain of Achaea, confiscated the principality and gave it to his son, Prince Philip I of Taranto.

In 1312, Philip married Catherine de la Tour du Pin (died 1337), daughter of Humbert I of Viennois and had issue:

 James of Piedmont
 Eleanor married Manfred V of Saluzzo and had issue.
 Beatrice married Humbert de Thoire-Villars and had issue.
 Agnes married John de la Chambre and had issue.
 Joan married Aymer of Valentinois and had issue.
 Margarita (daughter from Isabella of Villehardouin) married Renaud de Forez, lord of Malaval
 Amadeus, Bishop of Maurienne from 1349-1376
 Thomas, Bishop of Turin from 1351-1360
 Edward, Archbishop of Tarentaise from 1386-1395
 Aimone, married Mencia de Ceva, died 1398, was in Savoyard crusade.
 Alice, married Manfred of Carretto in 1324 and later married Antelme of Miolans.  Alice died in 1368.
 Isabelle, married John, viscount of Maurienne

Notes

References
 

  

1278 births
1334 deaths
Princes of Achaea
People from Susa, Piedmont
Lords of Piedmont
14th-century people from the Principality of Achaea